Thomas Carter ( – 3 June 1767) was an English politician.  He was a Member of Parliament (MP) for Kingston upon Hull from 1747 to 1754.

References 

1714 births
1767 deaths
Members of the Parliament of Great Britain for English constituencies
British MPs 1747–1754